The Strait of Dover or Dover Strait (  - Strait of Calais), is the strait at the narrowest part of the English Channel, marking the boundary between the Channel and the North Sea, separating Great Britain from continental Europe. The shortest distance across the strait, at approximately 20 miles (32 kilometres), is from the South Foreland, northeast of Dover in the English county of Kent, to Cap Gris Nez, a cape near to Calais in the French département of Pas-de-Calais. Between these points lies the most popular route for cross-channel swimmers. The entire strait is within the territorial waters of France and the United Kingdom, but a right of transit passage under the United Nations Convention on the Law of the Sea allows vessels of other nations to move freely through the strait.

On a clear day, it is possible to see the opposite coastline of England from France and vice versa with the naked eye, with the most famous and obvious sight being the White Cliffs of Dover from the French coastline and shoreline buildings on both coastlines, as well as lights on either coastline at night, as in Matthew Arnold's poem "Dover Beach".

Shipping traffic

Most maritime traffic between the Atlantic Ocean and the North Sea and Baltic Sea passes through the Strait of Dover, rather than taking the longer and more dangerous route around the north of Scotland. The strait is one of the busiest international seaways in the world, used by over 400 commercial vessels daily. This has made traffic safety a critical issue, with HM Coastguard and the Maritime Gendarmerie maintaining a 24-hour watch over the strait and enforcing a strict regime of shipping lanes.

In addition to the intensive north-east to south-west traffic, the strait is crossed from north-west to south-east by ferries linking Dover to Calais and Dunkirk. Until 1994 these provided the only route across it except for air transport.

The town of Dover gives its name to one of the sea areas of the British Shipping Forecast.

Geological formation

The strait is believed to have been created by the erosion of a land bridge that linked the Weald in Great Britain to the Boulonnais in the Pas de Calais. The predominant geology on both the British and French sides and on the seafloor is chalk. Although somewhat resistant to erosion, erosion of both coasts has created the famous white cliffs of Dover in the UK and the Cap Blanc Nez in France. The Channel Tunnel was bored through solid chalk.

The Rhine (as the Urstrom) flowed northwards into the North Sea as the sea level fell during the start of the first of the Pleistocene Ice Ages. The ice created a dam from Scandinavia to Scotland, and the Rhine, combined with the Thames and drainage from much of north Europe, created a vast lake behind the dam, which eventually spilled over the Weald into the English Channel. This overflow channel became the Strait of Dover about 425,000 years ago. A narrow deep channel along the middle of the strait was the bed of the Rhine in the last Ice Age. A geological deposit in East Anglia marks the old preglacial northward course of the Rhine.

A 2007 study concluded that the English Channel was formed by erosion caused by two major floods. The first was about 425,000 years ago, when an ice-dammed lake in the southern North Sea overflowed and broke the Weald-Artois chalk range in a catastrophic erosion and flood event. Afterwards, the Thames and Scheldt flowed through the gap into the English Channel, but the Meuse and Rhine still flowed northwards. In a second flood about 225,000 years ago the Meuse and Rhine were ice-dammed into a lake that broke catastrophically through a high weak barrier (perhaps chalk, or an end-moraine left by the ice sheet). Both floods cut massive flood channels in the dry bed of the English Channel, somewhat like the Channeled Scablands or the Wabash River in the USA.
A further update in 2017 attributed a series of previously described underwater holes in the Channel floor, "100m deep" and in places "several kilometres in diameter", to lake water plunging over a rock ridge causing isolated depressions or plunge pools.
The melting ice and rising sea levels submerged Doggerland, the area linking Britain to France 6,500–6,200 BCE.

Marine wildlife 

It presents a succession of rocky areas relatively deserted by ships wanting to spare their nets, and of sandy flats and sub-aqueous dunes. The strong currents of the Channel are slowed around the rocky areas of the strait, with formation of countercurrents and calmer zones where many species can find shelter. In these calmer zones, the water is clearer than in the rest of the strait; thus algae can grow despite the  average depth and help increase diversity in the local species – some of which are endemic to the strait. Moreover, this is a transition zone for the species of the Atlantic Ocean and those of the southern part of the North Sea.

This mix of various environments promotes a wide variety of wildlife.

A  area of the strait is classified as a Natura 2000 protection zone listed under the name Ridens et dunes hydrauliques du Pas de Calais (Ridens and sub-aqueous dunes of the Dover Strait). This area includes the sub-aqueous dunes of Varne, Colbart, Vergoyer and Bassurelle, the Ridens de Boulogne, and the Lobourg channel which provides calmer and clearer waters due to its depth reaching .

Unusual crossings

Many crossings other than in conventional vessels have been attempted, including by pedalo, jetpack, bathtub, amphibious vehicle and more commonly by swimming. French law bans many of these while English law does not, so most such crossings originate in England.

Ice
In the late 17th century during the "Little Ice Age", there were reports of severe winter ice in the English Channel and Strait of Dover, including a case in 1684 of only a league of open water remaining between Dover and Calais.

See also
 Battle of Dover Strait (1916)
 Battle of Dover Strait (1917)
 Calais Lighthouse
 South Foreland Lighthouse
 Cap Gris-Nez
 France–UK border

Notes

External links
 Channel Navigation Information Service
 Channel Swimming & Piloting Federation
 Channel Swimming Association
 Depth Chart showing straits and former course of Rhine

 
Straits of England
Landforms of Kent
Port of Dover, Kent
English Channel
France–United Kingdom border
International straits
Straits of Metropolitan France
Landforms of Hauts-de-France